Ines Varenkamp (born 15 November 1963) is a German former professional racing cyclist. She won the German National Road Race Championship in 1988. She also rode at the 1984 Summer Olympics and 1988 Summer Olympics.

References

External links
 

1963 births
Living people
German female cyclists
People from Varel
Cyclists at the 1984 Summer Olympics
Cyclists at the 1988 Summer Olympics
Olympic cyclists of West Germany
Cyclists from Lower Saxony
20th-century German women
21st-century German women